Paterson Rangers was a U.S. soccer team which played in Paterson, New Jersey during the early twentieth century.  They spent two seasons in New York’s Metropolitan Association Football League and nine in the National Association Football League

History
The origins of the Paterson Rangers is unknown, but they entered the Metropolitan Association Football League for the 1904-1905 season and on April 25, 1905 lost to the New York Caledonians in the semifinals of the New York State Cup.  In 1906, the Rangers joined the professional National Association Football League and remained in that league until 1915.  No records for the Rangers exist after that year.

Year-by-year

Honors
League Championship
 Runner Up (1): 1908

American Cup
 Runner Up (1): 1912

Clan MacDonald Cup
 Winner (1): 1909

External links
 National Association Football League standings

References

Defunct soccer clubs in New Jersey
National Association Football League teams
Sports in Paterson, New Jersey
1915 disestablishments in New Jersey
Association football clubs disestablished in 1915